Zachary Leader (born 1946) is an Emeritus Professor of English Literature at the University of Roehampton. He was an undergraduate at Northwestern University, and did graduate work at Trinity College, Cambridge and Harvard University, where he was awarded a PhD in English in 1977. Although born and raised in the U.S. he has lived for over forty years in the U.K., and has dual British and American citizenship. His best-known works are The Letters of Kingsley Amis (2001), The Life of Kingsley Amis (2007), a finalist for the 2008 Pulitzer Prize in Biography, and The Life of Saul Bellow: To Fame and Fortune, 1915-1964 (2015), which was shortlisted for the Wingate Prize in the U.K. The Life of Saul Bellow: Love and Strife 1965 to 2005 was published in 2018. He has written and edited a dozen books, including both volumes of the Saul Bellow biography, and is General Editor of The Oxford History of Life-Writing, a seven-volume series published by OUP. A recipient of Guggenheim, Whiting, Huntington, Leverhulme and British Academy Fellowships, he is also a Fellow of the Royal Society of Literature.



List of publications
 Reading Blake's Songs, (London and Boston: Routledge and Kegan Paul), 259pp. (1981)
 Writer's Block, (London and Baltimore: The Johns Hopkins University Press), 320pp. (1991)
 Revision and Romantic Authorship, (Oxford: Clarendon Press, 1996; pbk, 1999), 354pp. (1996)
 Romantic Period Writings 1798-1832: An Anthology, co-edited with Ian Haywood (London and Boston: Routledge, pbk), 254pp. (1999)
 The Letters of Kingsley Amis, edited by Z. Leader, London: HarperCollins, 2000; New York: Talk/Miramax, 1208pp. (2001) 
 On Modern British Fiction, edited by Z. Leader, Oxford: Oxford University Press, 319pp. (2002) 
 Percy Bysshe Shelley: The Major Works, co-edited by Z. Leader and M. O'Neill, Oxford and New York: Oxford University Press, 845pp. (2003)
 The Life of Kingsley Amis, Hardcover, New York: Random House, 1008 pp. (2006)
 The Movement Reconsidered: Essays on Larkin, Amis, Gunn, Davie and Their Contemporaries, edited by Z. Leader, Oxford: Oxford University Press, 336pp. (2008)
 The Life of Saul Bellow: To Fame and Fortune, 1915-1964 (London: Jonathan Cape, 2015; New York: Alfred Knopf), 812pp. (2015)
 On Life-Writing, edited by Z. Leader (Oxford: Oxford University Press), 315pp. (2015)
 The Life of Saul Bellow: Love and Strife, 1965-2005 (London: Jonathan Cape; New York: Alfred Knopf), 784pp (2018)

External links
"The Life of Kingsley Amis" (video), a conversation with Zachary Leader and Martin Amis, London Review of Books, accessed February 5, 2010.
Prof Zachary Leader, Roehampton University, accessed February 5, 2010.

1946 births
Living people
American literary critics
Northwestern University alumni
Alumni of Trinity College, Cambridge
Harvard University alumni
Academics of the University of Roehampton
Fellows of the Royal Society of Literature
American male biographers
20th-century American male writers
20th-century American non-fiction writers
21st-century American male writers
21st-century American biographers